is a Japanese footballer who currently plays for Balestier Khalsa.

Club career

Albirex Niigata (S) 
Hoshino signed his first professional contract for the White Swans after leaving Japan Soccer College.

Balestier Khalsa 
On 27 October 2021, Ryoya signed for Singapore Premier League side Balestier Khalsa.

Career statistics

Club

Notes

References

External links

1999 births
Living people
People from Kanazawa, Ishikawa
Association football people from Ishikawa Prefecture
Japanese footballers
Japanese expatriate footballers
Association football midfielders
Singapore Premier League players
Zweigen Kanazawa players
Japan Soccer College players
Albirex Niigata Singapore FC players
Balestier Khalsa FC players
Japanese expatriate sportspeople in Singapore
Expatriate footballers in Singapore